Evert Ellsworth Sparks (September 10, 1879 – May 11, 1972) was a politician from Alberta, Canada. He served in the Legislative Assembly of Alberta from 1921 to 1930 as a member of the United Farmers caucus in government.

Political career
Sparks first ran for a seat to the Alberta Legislature in the 1921 general election, as a United Farmers candidate in a two-way race against Liberal incumbent Hugh John Montgomery in the  electoral district of Wetaskiwin. He won by a comfortable margin to pick up the district for his party.

In the 1926 Alberta general election, Sparks faced Montgomery again and defeated him on the second count.

In the 1930 Alberta general election Sparks faced Montgomery once again; this time he was defeated by his predecessor.

References

External links
Legislative Assembly of Alberta Members Listing

United Farmers of Alberta MLAs
1972 deaths
1879 births
People from Labette County, Kansas